The United States ambassador to Antigua and Barbuda is the official representative of the government of the United States to the government of Antigua and Barbuda. The title of the ambassador is United States Ambassador to Barbados and the Eastern Caribbean and is concurrently the ambassador to Barbados, Dominica, Grenada, St. Kitts and Nevis, St. Lucia, and St. Vincent and the Grenadines, while resident in Bridgetown, Barbados. The official title of the ambassador is Ambassador Extraordinary and Plenipotentiary of the United States of America to Barbados and the Eastern Caribbean.

The United States established diplomatic relations with Antigua and Barbuda on November 1, 1981, when the Consulate General at St. John's was raised to  embassy status. Embassy St. John's closed on June 30, 1994. Since that time, all diplomatic functions have been handled out of the U.S. Embassy at Bridgetown, Barbados.

List of U.S. ambassadors to Antigua and Barbuda
The following is a list of ambassadors of the United States or other chiefs of mission, to Antigua and Barbuda. The title given by the United States State Department to this position is currently Ambassador Extraordinary and Plenipotentiary.

See also
Antigua and Barbuda – United States relations
Foreign relations of Antigua and Barbuda
Ambassadors of the United States

References

United States Department of State: Background notes on Antigua and Barbuda

External links
 United States Department of State: Chiefs of Mission for Antigua and Barbuda
 United States Department of State: Antigua and Barbuda
 United States Embassy in Bridgetown

 01
United States
Antigua and Barbuda
Antigua